Surya is a village in Dohuk Governorate, Kurdistan Region in Iraq.

History 
In 1969, the Ba'athist regime killed 39 men in the village.

In September 2020, clashes between Turkish forces and PKK took place in the village causing the village and its surroundings to catch fire.

The village was shelled by Turkey in July 2022.

References 

Populated places in Dohuk Province